Southwest Miami Senior High School  (colloquially known as simply "Southwest"), is a co-educational secondary school in Olympia Heights, a census-designated place in Miami-Dade County, Florida, United States. Southwest is currently an 'A' school and of the more than 30 public schools that are neither all magnet schools nor charter schools, Southwest is ranked second best in Miami-Dade county by U.S. News & World Report.

History 
Southwest Miami High School was founded in September 1956 as Southwest Miami Junior Senior High School. The school was built to alleviate overcrowding at neighboring Coral Gables Senior High School. Featuring grades 7-10, it was eventually converted to a high school in 1959 upon graduating its first senior class.

Southwest's athletic rival is Miami Coral Park Senior High School.

Demographics
Southwest Miami High School is 95% Hispanic, 1% Black and 4% other.

Student media
The student newspaper was the Lancer, the yearbook is Aquila (Latin for "eagle"), and TV production students are responsible for the morning announcements.

Performing arts
The Royal Lancer marching band used to perform at halftime of football games and the Illusion dancers perform throughout the school year.

Athletic achievements
Southwest has a rich history in athletics. By the time the first graduating class (1959) donned their caps and gowns, the Eagles had already won state championships in boys' basketball and boys' track.  On May 7, 1964, Southwest became the first Dade County white school to face a black school in a sport other than track when it took on George Washington Carver Senior High School in baseball. The Florida High School Athletic Association began sponsoring state championships in boys' volleyball in 2003 and, in the first eight years of the state tournament, the Eagles took home two state championships.

In 2010, alumnus Andre Dawson was inducted into the National Baseball Hall of Fame. The baseball field at Southwest is named in his honor.

State championships

Notable alumni

Athletics

Baseball
Dave Augustine, Class of 1967 - outfielder with the Pittsburgh Pirates (1973-1974)
Ray Bare, Class of 1967 - pitcher with the St. Louis Cardinals (1972, 1974) and Detroit Tigers (1975–1977)
Carlos Castillo, Class of 1994 - pitcher with the Chicago White Sox (1997–1999) and Boston Red Sox (2001)
Andre Dawson, Class of 1972 - outfielder with the Montreal Expos (1976–1986), Chicago Cubs  (1987–1992), Boston Red Sox (1993–1994) and Florida Marlins (1995–1996)
Fernando Hernandez, Class of 2002 - pitcher with the Oakland Athletics (2008)
Hansel Izquierdo, Class of 1995 - pitcher with the Florida Marlins (2002)
Dane Johnson, Class of 1981 - pitcher with the Chicago White Sox (1994), Toronto Blue Jays (1996), and Oakland Athletics (1997)
Juan Peña, Class of 1994 - pitcher with the Boston Red Sox (1999)
Michael Tejera, Class of 1995 - pitcher with the Florida Marlins (1999, 2002–2004) and Texas Rangers (2004–2005)
Jeff Urgelles, Class of 2000 - former bullpen coordinator with the Miami Marlins (2010–2017) 
Steve Tannen graduated in 66, All-american at University of Florida and was a running back for the New York Jets playing with Joe Namath.

Basketball
Jose Fernandez, Class of 1989 - head coach of the University of South Florida women's basketball team

Football
Randy Burke, Class of 1973 - wide receiver with the Baltimore Colts (1977, first round pick)
Tony Chickillo, Class of 1978- defensive line with the Tampa Bay Buccaneers (1983, fifth round pick), also played for the San Diego Chargers (1984-1985) and the New York Jets (1987)
Steve Tannen, Class of 1966 - defensive back with the New York Jets (1970, first round pick)
Lamarcus Joyner, class of 2009 - defensive back with the Los Angeles Rams (2014, second round pick)

Swimming
David Marsh, Class of 1977 - won 12 national titles as coach at Auburn University

Professional wrestling
Konnan, Class of 1982 - professional wrestler for WCW, ECW, ALL JAPAN WRESTLING, CMLL and AAA ( the last two in Mexico).

Government
 Ileana Ros-Lehtinen, Class of 1970 - Member of the U.S. House of Representatives (1989–present)
 Carol Browner, Class of 1973 - administrator of the Environmental Protection Agency (1993-2001)
 Dario Herrera, Class of 1991 - member of the Nevada Assembly (1997-1999); Clark County, Nevada commissioner (1999-2003)

Other
Charlie McCoy, Class of 1959 - member Country Music Hall of Fame and Museum
Ed Calle, Class of 1977 - musician
Alberto Cutié, Class of 1987 - Episcopal cleric, former Roman Catholic priest
Jonathan Demme, Class of 1962 - film director
Teresita Fernandez, Class of 1986 - artist
Lissette Garcia, Class of 2003 - Miss Florida USA 2011
Lindsay Hyde, Class of 2000 - founder and President of Strong Women Strong Girls
Jim Lampley, Class of 1966 - sportscaster
D. S. Lliteras, Class of 1967 - author

References

External links
 
 
 Southwest Miami Senior High School Alumni Association
 Southwest Miami Senior High School sports

Educational institutions established in 1956
Miami-Dade County Public Schools high schools
1956 establishments in Florida